Marfil is a 2011 documentary film.

Synopsis 
The first filmmaker arrived in Equatorial Guinea in 1904. The last movie theatre closed in Malabo in the 1990s. In 2011, during the II African Film Festival of Equatorial Guinea, the Marfil Movie Theatre reopened its doors. Florencio, Ángel and Estrada tells us how cinema has been, and is still, present in their lives.

External links 

 full Movie

2011 films
Equatoguinean documentary films
2011 short documentary films
Documentary films about African cinema
Films set in Equatorial Guinea